is a Japanese actor, voice actor and narrator from Edogawa, Tokyo, Japan. He is also active in the theatrical entertainment field and is the chairman of his own theatrical group, Gekidan Kishino Gumi. Some of the members of this group include fellow voice actors Kujira and Masaaki Okura. Among his successful for voicing characters are in Dynasty Warriors and Warriors Orochi series as Cao Cao.

Filmography

Television animation
1990s
Dragon Ball Z (1990) (Butta, Cell Games Announcer, Tao Pai Pai (episode 174))
Magic Knight Rayearth (1995) (Lafarga)
Slam Dunk (1995) (Jun Uozumi)
Trigun (1998) (Ruth Loose (ep. 1))
Cowboy Bebop (1998) (Jonathan (ep. 14))
One Piece (1999) (Higuma (ep. 4))
Detective Conan (1999) (Kunitomo Oda (ep. 172 - 173), Hyōe Kuroda)
2000s
Zoids: New Century/ZERO (2001) (Oscar Hemeros)
Hajime no Ippo: The Fighting! (2001) (Jimmy Sisphar's coach (ep. 40))
Onmyō Taisenki (2004) (Sōtarō Tachibana)

Unknown date
Kiteretsu Daihyakka (Kikunojō Hanamaru (second voice))

Tokusatsu
 B-Fighter Kabuto (Spirit Evil Beast Zanshoror (ep. 24), Darkness Wave Beast Dargriffon (ep. 44))
 Kyukyu Sentai GoGo-V (Spiritworld Guard Psyma Chaos (ep. 42 - 43))
 Hyakujuu Sentai Gaoranger (Bus Org (ep. 17))

Original video animation (OVA)
Legend of the Galactic Heroes (1989) (Stokes (ep. 21))
Transformers: Zone (1990) (BlackZarak, Predaking)
Slow Step (1991) (Bitō)
3×3 Eyes (1991) (Kimie Shingyōji)
Tōshinden (1996) (Mondo)
I'll CKBC (2002) (Masahito Hīragi)

Theatrical animation
Akira (1988) (Mitsuru Kawata, Assistant, Committee B, Terrorist)
NEMO (1989) (Goblin)
Dragon Ball Z: The World's Strongest (1990) (Kishime)
Street Fighter II: The Movie (1994) (Dhalsim)
Fullmetal Alchemist: The Sacred Star of Milos (2011) (Gonzales)
Detective Conan: Zero the Enforcer (2018) (Hyōe Kuroda)

Video games
Double Dragon (1995) (Eddie)
Super Dodge Ball (1996) (Sabu)
Castlevania (2003) (Walter Bernhard)
Dynasty Warriors series (1997–present) (Cao Cao)
Dead or Alive 3 (2002) (Brad Wong)
Dead or Alive 4 (2005) (Brad Wong)
TwinBee series (1991–present) (Dr. Warumon)
Valkyria Chronicles series (Calvaro Rodriguez)
Warriors Orochi series (2007–present) (Cao Cao)

Radio drama
TwinBee Paradise (1993) (Dr. Warumon)

Dubbing

Live-action
Speed 2: Cruise Control (Maurice (Glenn Plummer))

Animation
Bambi (The Great Prince of the Forest)
Beast Wars: Transformers (General Ram Horn)

References

External links
Official agency profile 

1955 births
Living people
Aoni Production voice actors
Japanese male musical theatre actors
Japanese male video game actors
Japanese male voice actors
Male voice actors from Tokyo
20th-century Japanese male actors
21st-century Japanese male actors